Paul Mausner (1910–2001) was a French fashion designer whose "Paul Mausner" brand of clothing is still sold today.  He created a stylish line of women's clothing and worked in the fashion industry for 70 years.

External links
official website

French fashion designers
1910 births
2001 deaths